The gerenuk (Litocranius walleri), also known as the giraffe gazelle, is a long-necked, medium-sized antelope found in parts of East Africa. The sole member of the genus Litocranius, the gerenuk was first described by the naturalist Victor Brooke in 1879. It is characterised by its long, slender neck and limbs. Two types of colouration are clearly visible on the smooth coat: the reddish brown back or the "saddle", and the lighter flanks, fawn to buff. The horns, present only on males, are lyre-shaped. Curving backward then slightly forward, these measure .

Taxonomy and phylogeny
The gerenuk was first described by Victor Brooke in 1879 on the basis of three male specimens procured on "the mainland of Africa, north of the island of Zanzibar". Brooke used the scientific name Gazella walleri, on the request of Gerald Waller (who provided the specimens) to name it after his deceased brother. The type locality was later corrected by John Kirk, who originally obtained the specimens on the "coast near the River Juba in southern Somalia" before giving them to Waller. In 1886, Franz Friedrich Kohl proposed a new genus for the gerenuk, Litocranius. The common name derives from the Somali name for the animal (gáránúug); the first recorded use of the name dates back to 1895. It is also known as the "giraffe gazelle" due to its similarity to the giraffe.

Two subspecies have been proposed, but these are considered to be independent species by some authors.

 L. w. sclateri (Northern gerenuk or Sclater's gazelle) Neumann, 1899: Its range extends from northwestern Somalia (Berbera District) westward to touch the Ethiopian border and Djibouti.
 L. w. walleri (Southern gerenuk or Waller's gazelle) (Brooke, 1879): Its range extends through northeastern Tanzania through Kenya to Galcaio (Somalia). The range lies north of the Shebelle River and near Juba River.

In 1997 Colin Groves proposed that Litocranius is a sister taxon of the similarly long-necked dibatag (Ammodorcas clarkei), but withdrew from this in 2000. A 1999 phylogenetic study based on cytochrome b and cytochrome c oxidase subunit III analysis showed that the tribe Antilopini, to which the gerenuk belongs, is monophyletic. In 2013, Eva Verena Bärmann and colleagues (of the University of Cambridge) revised the phylogeny of tribe on the basis of nuclear and mitochondrial gene analysis. The cladogram prepared by them (given below) showed that the springbok (Antidorcas marsupialis) forms a clade with the gerenuk; this clade is sister to the saiga (Saiga tatarica, tribe Saigini) and the genera Antilope (blackbuck), Eudorcas, Gazella and Nanger (of Antilopini).

Description 

The gerenuk is a notably tall, slender antelope that resembles gazelles. It is characterised by its long, slender neck and limbs, the flat, wedge-like head and the large, round eyes. The species is sexually dimorphic. The tail, that ends in a black tuft, measures .

Two types of colouration are clearly visible on the smooth coat: the reddish brown dorsal parts (the back or the "saddle"), and the lighter flanks, fawn to buff. The underbelly and insides of the legs are cream in colour. The eyes and the mouth are surrounded by white fur. Females have a dark patch on the crown. The horns, present only on males, are lyre-like ("S"-shaped). Curving backward then slightly forward, these measure . 

The gerenuk resembles the dibatag, with which it is sympatric in eastern and central Somalia and southeastern Ethiopia. Both are brachyodonts and share several facial and cranial features, along with a two-tone colouration of the coat and strong thick horns (only in males). However, there are also some features distinguishing it from the gerenuk, including major morphological differences in horns, horn cores, tail, postorbital area and basioccipital processes. The gerenuk has a longer, heavier neck and a shorter tail. A finer point of difference is the absence of an inward-curving lobe in the lower edge of the ear (near its tip) in the gerenuk. The subspecies of the gerenuk are similar in colouration; the southern gerenuk is the smaller of the two.

Ecology and behaviour
The gerenuk is a diurnal animal (active mainly during the day), though it typically stands or rests in shade during the noon. Foraging and feeding is the major activity throughout the day; females appear to spend longer time in feeding. The gerenuk may expose itself to rain, probably to cool its body. The social structure consists of small herds of two to six members. Herds typically comprise members of a single sex, though female herds additionally have juveniles. Some males lead a solitary life.

Fighting and travel are uncommon, possibly as a strategy to save energy for foraging. Both sexes maintain home ranges  large, and might overlap. Those of males are scent-marked with preorbital gland secretions and guarded - hence these may be termed territories. The sedentary tendency of the antelope appears to increase with age.

Diet

Primarily a browser, the gerenuk feed on foliage of bushes as well as trees, shoots, herbs, flowers and fruits. Acacia species are eaten whenever available, while evergreen vegetation forms the diet during droughts. The pointed mouth assists in extracting leaves from thorny vegetation. The gerenuk does not drink water regularly. Major predators of the antelope include African wild dogs, cheetahs, hyenas, lions and leopards.

Reproduction
Gerenuk reproduce throughout the year. Females reach sexual maturity at around one year, and males reach sexual maturity at 1.5 years, although in the wild they may only be successful after acquiring a territory (perhaps 3.5 years). The gestation period is about seven months. Offspring were produced through artificial insemination for the first time in 2010 at White Oak Conservation in Yulee, Florida. Four female calves were born, and one of the four was later inseminated successfully by White Oak and SEZARC (South-East Zoo Alliance for Reproduction & Conservation), creating a second generation of calves born from artificial insemination. Gerenuk can live thirteen years or more in captivity, and at least eight years in the wild.

References

Further reading

External links

 Gerenuk at the Encyclopædia Britannica
 Gerenuk at Al Wabra Wildlife Preserve

Antilopini
Fauna of East Africa
Fauna of the Horn of Africa
Mammals described in 1879
Mammals of Djibouti
Mammals of Ethiopia
Mammals of Kenya
Mammals of Somalia
Mammals of Tanzania